Empress Xiaocigao (1575 – 31 October 1603), of the Manchu Yehe Nara clan, personal name Monggo Jerjer, was a consort of Nurhaci. She was 16 years his junior.

Life

Family background
 Father: Yangginu (d. 1584), held the title of a third rank prince
 Paternal grandfather: Taicu, held the title of a third rank prince
 Paternal uncle: Cinggiyanu (d. 1584), held the title of a third rank prince, the father of Bujai (d. 1593)
 Two elder brothers
 First elder brother: Narimbulu (d. 1609), held the title of a third rank prince
 Second elder brother: Gintaisi (d. 1619), held the title of a third rank prince

Wanli era
In October or November 1588, Lady Yehe Nara married Nurhaci, becoming one of his multiple wives. On 28 November 1592, she gave birth to Nurhaci's eighth son, Hong Taiji. Lady Yehe Nara died on 31 October 1603.

Chongde era
On 16 May 1636, after Hong Taiji established the Qing dynasty, Lady Yehe Nara was posthumously elevated to "Empress Xiaociwu".

Kangxi era
In 1662, Lady Yehe Nara's posthumous title was changed from "Empress Xiaociwu" to "Empress Xiaocigao", reflecting her status as a consort of Nurhaci (Emperor Gao).

Titles
 During the reign of the Wanli Emperor (r. 1572–1620):
 Lady Yehe Nara (from 1575)
 Secondary consort (from October/November 1588)
 Primary consort
 During the reign of Hong Taiji (r. 1626–1643):
 Empress Xiaociwu (from 16 May 1636)
 During the reign of the Kangxi Emperor (r. 1661–1722):
 Empress Xiaocigao (from 1662)

Issue
 As secondary consort:
 Hong Taiji (28 November 1592 – 21 September 1643), Nurhaci's eighth son, enthroned on 20 October 1626

In fiction and popular culture
 Portrayed by Mak Tsui-han in The Rise and Fall of Qing Dynasty (1987)
 Portrayed by Shi Xiaoqun in Taizu Mishi (2005)

See also
 Ranks of imperial consorts in China#Qing
 Royal and noble ranks of the Qing dynasty

Notes

References
 
 
 
 

1575 births
1603 deaths
Xiaocigao, Empress
Jurchens in Ming dynasty
16th-century Chinese women
16th-century Chinese people
17th-century Chinese women
17th-century Chinese people